Postel is a surname, and may refer to:

 Guillaume Postel (1510–1581), French linguist, astronomer, Cabbalist, diplomat, and religious universalist 
 Christian Heinrich Postel (1658–1705), German jurist, epic poet and opera librettist
 Georg-Wilhelm Postel, a World War II German general
 Gert Postel, a German impostor
 Guillaume Postel, a French polymath
 Jon Postel, an Internet pioneer
 Kaitlynne Postel, a competitor for Miss America 2008
 Sandra Postel, founder of the Global Water Policy Project

Postel is also a village in the Mol municipality in Belgium, the location of Postel Abbey.

See also
Postell, surname